Elwendia is a genus of flowering plants belonging to the family Apiaceae.

Its native range is Turkey to Central Asia and Western Himalaya.

Species
Species:

Elwendia afghanica 
Elwendia alata 
Elwendia angreni 
Elwendia badachschanica 
Elwendia bucharica 
Elwendia cabulica 
Elwendia capusii 
Elwendia caroides 
Elwendia chaerophylloides 
Elwendia cylindrica 
Elwendia fedtschenkoana 
Elwendia hissarica 
Elwendia intermedia 
Elwendia kopetdagensis 
Elwendia kuhitangi 
Elwendia latiloba 
Elwendia lindbergii 
Elwendia longipes 
Elwendia persica 
Elwendia salsa 
Elwendia sary-cheleki 
Elwendia seravschanica 
Elwendia setacea 
Elwendia stewartiana 
Elwendia ugamica 
Elwendia vaginata 
Elwendia wolffii

References

Apiaceae
Apiaceae genera